Sadar Bazaar is the largest wholesale cosmetics jewellery market of household items in Old Delhi, Delhi, India. 

Like other major markets of Old Delhi, this market is very crowded and buzzes with activity. Although it is primarily a wholesale market, it also caters to occasional retail buyers. Owing to the sheer volumes that are traded here every day, a visit to the market can be termed sensory overload. In addition to being a market for traders, Sadar Bazaar is a assembly constituency, making it a hub for politics.

History
Paharganj, also referred as Shahganj or King's ganj or market place during Mughal era, gets its present name 'Paharganj', literally meaning Hilly neighbourhood, owing to its proximity to the Raisina Hill, where the Rashtrapati Bhavan stand today. Till, 1857, neighbourhoods like Paharganj, Kishenganj, and Pahari Dhiraj, were separate pockets which in the following years grew and merged, for example Pahari Dhiraj merged into Sadar Bazaar.

During the British Raj, Muslims had built a slaughterhouse closer to the Jhandewalan temple. In May 1924 on the day of Bakri Eid the Muslims of Pahari Dhiraj of Paharganj slaughtered the cow - which is revered by the Hindus as sacred Kamadhenu - in the slaughterhouse closer to the Jhandewala temple. This angered the Hindu Gurjars of Sadar Bazaar, which led to the riots among the Gurjars and Muslims from 11 July to 18 July, resulting in loss of life and property. Riots were eventually stopped by the police.

Location and transportation

Sadar Bazaar is located on the western side of Khari Baoli street. It is connected to the rest of the city via buses (closest station is Kashmere Gate ISBT), auto-rickshaws and trains (closest metro station is Tis Hazari  Metro Station).

The area also has a railway station named Delhi Sadar Bazar (Code: DSB). All the trains that stop here are either EMUs, MEMUs or passenger trains consisting of General class seating arrangements.

Commodities 
Sadar Bazaar consists of numerous smaller markets, including Pratap market, Swadeshi market and Teliwara or Timber market. The market, as a whole, not only deals in household goods, but also in various other items such as toys, imitation jewellery and stationery. It has become a den of counterfeit products of many multi-national companies, FMCG products and especially cosmetic goods of deceptively similar character.

Traders and shoppers have access to authentic Indian food, including delicacies deep-fried in ghee (clarified butter) and mithai (traditional sweets) of various kinds. The lanes are plenty and narrow, lined with shops selling imported goods, clothing, shoes and leather items, electronic and consumer goods, and more. The market, even more so than the rest of the city, is very congested.

Concerns 
Considered by some to be the biggest wholesale market in Asia, accounts from local traders indicate that Sadar Bazaar suffers from over-congestion of stalls, power cuts, lack of sanitation facilities, improper maintenance of roads and frequent traffic jams.

Despite being chaotic, Sadar Bazaar remains a tourist attraction.

Swadeshi Market

Swadeshi Market in Sadar Bazaar is famous for artificial jewellery, toys, gifts item, and household plastics. Inside Sadar Bazaar, every lane is having its local association and having shops of different goods.

As of 2015, Vijay Malhotra (Yogiraj) is the president of Swadeshi Market.

Administration and politics
Federation of Sadar Bazar Traders Association (Regd.) is the parental organisation of all the major trade associations of Sadar Bazaar.

Sadar Bazaar is part of the Sadar-Paharganj constituency, one of the twelve administrative zones of Municipal Corporation of Delhi (MCD). As of 2015, this constituency is represented by Som Dutt of the Aam Aadmi Party. Prior to Dutt, this Vidhan Sabha constituency was represented by Rajesh Jain of the Indian National Congress (INC). Previously a parliamentary constituency, it is now a part of Chandni Chowk parliamentary constituency represented by Harsh Vardhan of the BJP.

See also

References 

Bazaars
Bazaars in India
Cities and towns in North Delhi district
Neighbourhoods in Delhi
North Delhi district
Wholesale markets in India